Litsea glutinosa is a rainforest tree in the laurel family, Lauraceae. Common names include soft bollygum, bolly beech, Bollywood, bollygum, brown bollygum, brown Bollywood, sycamore and brown beech.

The powdered bark, known as jigat, may be used as an adhesive paste in incense stick production.

Distribution
This species is native to India, South China to Malaysia, Philippines, Australia and the western Pacific islands.

It had been introduced to La Réunion, Mauritius, Mayotte and New Caledonia where it is considered an invasive species.

References

glutinosa
Flora of China
Flora of Taiwan
Flora of tropical Asia
Flora of the Northern Territory
Flora of Queensland
Flora of Western Australia
Trees of Australia
Incense material